Tom Thomson (1877–1917) was a Canadian painter from the beginning of the 20th century. Beginning from humble roots, his development as a career painter was meteoric, only pursuing it seriously in the final years of his life. He became one of the foremost figures in Canadian art, leaving behind around 400 small oil sketches and around fifty larger works on canvas.

Beginning his career in 1902 as a graphic designer, he only began to paint seriously in 1912 at the age of 35. His skills developed as he ventured through Algonquin Park, sketching scenes that interested him. His creative peak came from 1914 until his untimely death in 1917. His art style progressed from sombre, grey scenes into brilliantly coloured exposés, characterized by rapid and thickly applied brushstrokes. His later works presage the advances seen by the Abstract Expressionist movement.

Materials and working method

Sketch to canvas

The artwork of Thomson is typically divided into two bodies: the first is made up of the small oil sketches on wood panels, of which there are around 400, and the second is of around fifty larger works on canvas. The smaller sketches were typically done in the style of en plein air in "the North," primarily Algonquin Park, in the spring, summer and fall. The larger canvases were instead completed over the winter in Thomson's studio—an old utility shack with a wood-burning stove on the grounds of the Studio Building, an artist's enclave in Rosedale, Toronto. Although he sold few of the larger paintings during his lifetime, they formed the basis of posthumous exhibitions, including one at Wembley in London, that eventually brought international attention to his work, though the more plentiful sketches have typically been thought of as the core of his work.

He considered most of his sketches to be complete works in themselves and not studies for larger works, since in the transition to a larger canvas the works lose their characteristic intimacy. Still, a dozen or so of the major canvases were directly derived from smaller sketches. Indeed, paintings like Northern River, Spring Ice, The Jack Pine and The West Wind were only later expanded into larger oil paintings. While the sketches were produced quickly, the canvases were developed over weeks or even months. Because of this, they display an "inherent formality," with the transition from small to large requiring a reinvention or elaboration of the original details. In this transition he often exaggerated hillsides or other landscape features to give the final picture greater depth. Comparing sketches with their respective canvases allows one to see the changes Thomson made in colour, detail and background textural patterns.

Materials
In 1914 Thomson made himself a sketch box to hold 8½ × 10½ inch (21.6 × 26.7 cm) panels. The lower half of the box served as a palette, while the upper half served as a support for canvas or wood panels. Slots made room for three paintings to be carried at any given time, keeping them apart so wet paint did not smear or flatten. Thomson utilized different materials throughout his career, providing a method for dating paintings. For example, the wood panels he used in 1914 developed vertical cracks. He had only occasionally used hard wood-pulp board in 1914, but consistently began using it in 1915. In the spring and fall of 1915 he used terra cotta-coloured and carnation-coloured paint as sealers, but by 1916 he had switched to ochre paint. In the spring of 1917 he disassembled and cut up wood crates to make into 5 × 7 inch (12.7 × 17.8 cm) panels for sketching, smaller than those he normally painted on and requiring tighter handling. Fragments of brand names (e.g. Gold Medal Purity Flour, California Oranges) are stamped on the back of some, such as Birches and An Ice Covered Lake. During the same spring he reused around one-third of his sketches, either because he was not satisfied with them or because he was short on painting materials.

In 2000, a study was conducted to understand the materials and working method of Thomson. In 2002–03, before a travelling exhibition organized by the National Gallery of Canada and the Art Gallery of Ontario, the Canadian Conservation Institute utilized infrared and X-ray photography, spectroscopy and micro-sampling of pigments to further analyze many of Thomson's paintings. Sandra Webster-Cook and Anne Ruggles described in their research how Thomson applied differently coloured primers in various parts of his paintings to give them subtle yet important qualities.

Photography

Thomson occasionally used photography to capture things that gained his interest, such as fish he caught, images of his friends or the landscape. He does not seem to have used any of his photographs for producing art, with none of the extant photos corresponding to any of his paintings. He instead preferred to capture images with small oil sketches, and nearly all of the works he produced are among these small sketches. David Silcox however has speculated that Drowned Land (and perhaps other paintings) may have been painted with a photograph as a memory aid given their "uncanny precision."

In 1912 while travelling up the Spanish River in the Mississagi area with William Broadhead, Thomson lost at least a dozen rolls of film (claiming in a letter that he lost 14 dozen) along with many more sketches after their canoe experienced several spills. He had intended to bring the images back to Grip Limited and use them in his commercial work.

Developments

Commercial art

Tom Thomson's first foray into art came in 1901 with his education at Canada Business College in Chatham, Ontario. It was there that he developed rudimentary penmanship abilities. By 1902, he had been hired in Seattle at the design firm Maring & Ladd, working as a pen artist, draftsman and etcher. His main work there consisted in producing business cards, brochures and posters, as well as three-colour printing. Having previously learned calligraphy, he specialized in lettering, drawing and painting. Thomson may have also worked as a freelance commercial designer, but there are no extant examples of such work to confirm these suspicions. He was greatly influenced by the black and white illustrations he saw in magazines, something especially apparent in his  sketch, Study of a Woman's Head, which draws inspiration from the "Gibson Girl" of American illustrator Charles Dana Gibson. Thomson's younger brother Ralph wrote about Thomson during this period:

After returning to Toronto, Thomson joined the artistic design firm Grip Ltd. in either 1908 or 1909. The firm specialized in design and lettering work. Grip was the leading graphic design company in the country and introduced Art Nouveau, metal engraving and the four-colour process to Canada. Albert Robson, then the art director at Grip, recalled that when he first hired Thomson, "his samples consisted mostly of lettering and decorative designs applied to booklet covers and some labels."

The techniques he learned regarding Art Nouveau became apparent in many of his later works, including paintings like Northern River; Decorative Landscape, Birches; Spring Ice and The West Wind. Of particular note are the sinuous forms typical within the art style, seen in the "S-curves" of the trees which have their origins in Thomson's work as a draughtsman. Fellow artist A. Y. Jackson affirmed the Group of Seven's tendency towards using Art Nouveau styles within their work, writing that, "We (the Group of Seven and Tom Thomson) treated our subjects with the freedom of designers. We tried to emphasize colour, line and pattern."

The senior artist at Grip, J. E. H. MacDonald, encouraged his staff to paint outside in their spare time to better hone their skills. MacDonald had perhaps the largest influence on Thomson's career as a painter; he enticed Thomson away from the commercial field and brought him towards painting through not only the encouraged weekend outdoor sketching, but through painting trips on holidays and introducing him to his fellow artists. MacDonald himself credited William Broadhead with Thomson's emergence as a painter, writing in a letter to Arthur Lismer that "My memories in connection with Tom seem to begin with B[roadhead]." In a draft of an article, Harold Mortimer-Lamb similarly credited Broadhead with Thomson's emergence. Lismer took exception to their claims, instead crediting MacDonald. A. Y. Jackson also expressed that Thomson's major development came after his ventures to Algonquin Park, rather than his time as a graphic designer. Lismer later wrote,

Painting career

First ventures to Algonquin Park (1912–13)

It was in 1912 that Thomson's transition from commercial art towards his original style of painting became apparent. This transition appears to have been instigated by his first visit to Algonquin Park in May 1912. He acquired his first sketching equipment, but spent most of his trip fishing, save for "a few notes, skylines and colour effects." Dating sketches to this trip has sometimes proved difficult. One exception is the sketch Smoke Lake, Algonquin Park, easily dated because Thomson gave it to Bud Callighen around the time of their first meeting. Charles Hill has also included the "somewhat awkward" Old Lumber Dam, Algonquin Park as likely being made during the trip. Robson identified Drowned Land as being painted on the Mississagi Forest Reserve canoe trip. Also dated to this time are The Canoe and A Northern Lake (1912).

In fall 1912 Thomson left Grip Ltd. to join another design firm, Rous & Mann. Leonard Rossell went on to write, "Those who worked there were all allowed time off to pursue their studies... Tom Thomson, so far as a I know, never took definite lessons from anyone, yet he progressed quicker than any of us. But what he did was probably of more advantage to him. He took several months off in the summer and spent them in Algonquin Park."

In October 1912 Thomson was first introduced to Dr. James MacCallum, a frequent visitor of the Ontario Society of Artists' (OSA) exhibitions and The Arts and Letters Club of Toronto. MacCallum convinced Thomson to leave his position at Rous and Mann and commit to a career in painting. Lawren Harris later recalled Thomson's major developments around this time:

MacCallum offered to cover Thomson's expenses for a year on the promise that he fully committed himself to painting, an offer Thomson eventually accepted after some initial hesitance. MacCallum wrote that when he first saw Thomson's sketches, he recognized their "truthfulness, their feeling and their sympathy with the grim fascinating northland... they made me feel that the North had gripped Thomson as it had gripped me since I was eleven when I first sailed and paddled through its silent places." He further wrote that Thomson's paintings were "dark, muddy in colour, tight and not wanting in technical defects."

Thomson's ventures to the wilderness of Ontario were major sources of inspiration in his art, writing in a letter to MacCallum that the beauty of Algonquin Park was indescribable. His early works, such as Northern Lake (1912–13) and Evening were not outstanding technically, yet they illustrate a particular talent for composition and colour handling. The sale of the former to the Ontario Government in March 1913 for $250 allowed him to spend more time in the summer and fall of 1913 sketching. MacCallum described the painting as a "picture [of] one of the small northern lakes swept by a north west wind; a squall just passing from the far shore, the water crisp, sparkingly blue & broken into short, white-caps—a picture full of light, life and vigour." Thomson's sketches from 1913 are often grey, but display greater colour handling than that seen in the earlier sketch of Northern Lake. Most of these sketches are simple with a far off shore. Canvases like Morning Cloud and Moonlight use broken brushwork, a technique he likely learned from MacDonald and Jackson.

Colour and experimentation (1914–15)

Thomson often experienced self-doubt, with A. Y. Jackson recalling that in the fall of 1914, Thomson threw his sketch box into the woods out of frustration, and was "so shy he could hardly be induced to show his sketches." While his work from this period still displays "a certain awkwardness," Thomson surpassed his colleagues Jackson and Lismer in his brilliance of colour. In a letter to MacCallum, Jackson wrote,

The sketches produced in 1915 display his increasing tendency towards experimentation and his sensitivity to colour, experimenting with texture and colour in ways that his earlier subdued and precise work had avoided. Beyond his work as a colourist, he developed a technique of presenting contradictory ideas that were simultaneously resolved within the same image. Typically he accomplished this by using the techniques of both Tonalism and Post-Impressionism, later achieving it by joining decorative patterns with bold handling. Jackson wrote regarding this period of Thomson's work, "No longer handicapped by literal representation, he was transposing, eliminating, designing, experimenting, finding happy colour motives amid tangle and confusion and [reveling] in paint. The amount of work he did was incredible."

Over the 1915–16 winter in Toronto, Thomson produced several canvases, including In the Northland; The Birch Grove, Autumn; Autumn's Garland; Opulent October and Spring Ice. The sketches of his work display a two-dimensionality. Thomson's work from this period—like the works of Harris, Lismer and MacDonald—became more decorative. The colour is heightened, with spaces flattened and forms arranged into vertical bands. The branches and trunks of trees are more stylized in nature.

Creative peak (1916–17)

In 1916, Thomson left for Algonquin Park earlier than any previous year, evidenced by the large number of snow studies he produced at this time. He produced many sketches which varied in composition, though they all had vivid colour and were applied thickly. Over the following winter, encouragement from Harris, MacDonald and MacCallum saw Thomson move into the most productive portion of his career, writing in a letter that he "got quite a lot done." It was during this time that he produced many of what became his most famous works, including The Jack Pine and The West Wind.

In the last two years of his life especially, Thomson was particularly skilled in observing atmospheric phenomena, such as temperature, humidity, wind and light. Work from this period—such as The Rapids—demonstrate his adeptness at controlling colour and are painted with a particular "crispness and freshness." Other paintings—such as Path Behind Mowat Lodge and Tea Lake Dam—illustrate his bold and expressive brushstrokes. The scale of Thomson's later canvases foreshadow the Algoma canvases the members of the Group of Seven painted after the war. Art historians David Silcox and Harold Town have described this period of Thomson's art as moving in the direction of abstraction.

Approaching abstraction

Thomson was prolific in the number of sketches he produced—over four hundred across his entire career—providing an opportunity to observe the trends and progression of his style. Starting as a landscape painter, he drew away from typical landscape convention and began to experiment with more excited brushstrokes, clashing paint and more vibrant colours. For artist and Thomson biographer Harold Town, the brevity of Thomson's career hinted at an artistic evolution never fully realized. He cites the 1916 oil painting Unfinished Sketch as "the first completely abstract work in Canadian art," a painting that, whether or not it was intended as a purely non-objective work, presages the innovations of abstract expressionism. Town describes the contents of the painting as being a sky that expresses the frustration Thompson must have experienced in adding paint to the small areas between trees, rocks and thickets. He similarly describes Late Autumn as being another "impatient study" that led to abstract experiment. Of particular importance are the areas between the branches, which are "brusquely smacked into place," as well as a similar foreground to that of Unfinished Sketch.

David Silcox has pointed to Cranberry Marsh as indicating Thomson's move towards abstraction. He has also viewed After the Storm, likely one of Thomson's last paintings, as an indication that Thomson was already responding to the changes happening in Western art, even if he didn't exactly know where it would lead. Examining the painting more closely, the landscape itself dissolves into bare strokes and pure abstraction.

Art historian Joan Murray has expressed reluctance to describe Thomson's sketches as "abstract," given that some of them may have likely been intended as "colour notes for use in the studio," and because some of the sketches were unfinished.

References

Footnotes

Citations

Sources

Primary sources
 
 
 
 
 
 
 
 
 
 
 
 
 
 
 
 
 
 
 
 

Secondary sources
 
 
 
 
 
 
 
 
 
 
 
 
 
 
 
 
 
 
 
 
 
 
 
 
 
 
 
 
 

History of art in Canada